Mirza Shafi Vazeh was an Azerbaijani poet and teacher. Under the pseudonym "Vazeh", which means "expressive, clear", he wrote in both Azerbaijani and Persian, developing the traditions of poetry in both languages. He compiled the first anthology of Azerbaijani poetry and a Tatar-Russian dictionary for the Tiflis gymnasium with Russian teacher Ivan Grigoriev.

He has written multiple ghazals, mukhammases, mathnawis and rubais. His poems were mostly intimate, lyrical and satirical. The main theme of Vazeh's works is the glorification of romantic love and the joy of life, but in some of his poems, he denounces the vices of feudal society and opposes slavery and religious fanaticism.

The German poet Friedrich von Bodenstedt, who took oriental language lessons from Vazeh, published translations of Vazeh's poems in his book A Thousand and One Days in the East in 1850. Bodenstedt's book, titled Songs of Mirza Shafi, was published in 1851.

Life

Birth date
Mirza Shafi Sadykh oglu was born at the turn of the 18th–19th centuries in Ganja. The exact date of his birth is disputed. Soviet-era encyclopedias such as the Great Soviet Encyclopedia,  the Concise Literary Encyclopedia and the Philosophical Encyclopedia state that Mirza Shafi was born in 1796, but a number of authors write that he was born in 1794. According to Willem Floor and Hasan Javadi in The Heavenly Rose-garden: A History of Shirvan & Daghestan, by Abbas Qoli Aqa Bakikhanov, Vazeh was born in 1792.

According to the orientalist Adolf Berge, he saw Mirza Shafi Vazeh, whom he described as "a modest, about 60 year old Tatar" in the streets of Tiflis in 1851. This would suggest the poet was born before 1800. Archive documents contain completely different information. In the "Official List of Service for 1845" it is written that Mirza Shafi is 40 years old. This would mean Vazeh was born in 1805. At the same time, in the "Official List of Service for 1852", it is written that he is 45 years old, indicating that he was born in 1807. According to orientalist Ivan Yenikolopov, the most trustworthy source is the "Official List of Service for 1845" which was approved by Mirza Shafi's commander-in-chief, A.K. Monastyrski.

Early life
Mirza Shafi's father was Sadykh Kerbalayi, more commonly known as Usta Sadykh, who served as an architect for Javad Khan, the last khan of the Ganja Khanate. The poet's elder brother, Abdul-Ali, became an architect like his father.

Mirza Shafi was born in the years of the Russian conquest of the Caucasus. In 1804, Russian forces besieged and eventually captured Mirza Shafi's hometown, Ganja. After its fall, General Pavel Tsitsianov renamed Ganja Elisabethpol (in honour of Russian empress Elizabeth Alexeievna) and integrated the khanate's territory as part of the Georgia Governorate of the Russian Empire. Mirza Shafi's family was seriously affected by these events as his father lost his income.

Orientalist Adolf Berge, citing Mirza Fatali Akhundov, an Azerbaijani critic, noted that after the fall of the Ganja Khanate, Mirza Shafi's father went bankrupt, then fell ill and later died. His father's death date is unknown, though literary critic Aliajdar Seidzade argues he died in early 1805. Mirza Shafi's father's bankruptcy is confirmed by a letter sent from a poet by the name of Shakir to poet Gasim bey Zakir, in which Sadykh from Ganja (Mirza Shafi's father), along with a certain Haji-Qurban, are mentioned as being rich men, who became completely impoverished.

According to historian Mikhail Semevsky, Mirza Shafi was "a kind, simple man who was Tatar by origin, and Persian by upbringing".

Education

Shafi's interest in books and science was evident from an early age. Because of this, his father sent him to the madrasa at the Shah Abbas Mosque in Ganja. His father wanted him to become a mullah. Shafi's interests and abilities grew at the madrasa, where he learned Persian and Arabic language and was taught calligraphy. Adolf Berge wrote in his article titled "Journal of the German Oriental Society":

Shafi did not want to become a mullah but wanted to learn literature and different languages instead. As his father was alive, Shafi did not want to go against his wishes He continued his education in the madrasa until his father's death. At the time of his father's death, while Shafi was still studying in the madrasa, Haji Abdullah returned from Tabriz to Ganja. According to Adolf Berje, Haji Abdullah was "of remarkable spiritual qualities and high morality". He played a significant role in shaping Shafi's personality.

According to Adolf Berge, Haji Abdullah was born in Ganja and went to Tabriz to engage in trade. In Persia, he visited holy places and made a pilgrimage to Mecca. Later, he lived in Baghdad for some time where he met a dervish named Seid Sattar, who taught him about Sufism. After returning to Ganja, Haji Abdullah argued constantly with the local mullahs and akhoonds (Muslim clerics) of the Shah Abbas mosque, trying to prove the inconsistency and absurdity of religious prejudices and superstitions. Because of this, he made enemies of most of the local clergy.

Haji Abdullah enlightened Shafi. Seeing the change in Shafi's mindset, the madrasa's mullahs refused to continue teaching him. After this, Shafi was forced to leave the madrasa and from this point, according to Berge, the development of Shafi's complete contempt for the clergy began. In his arguments with the mullahs, Shafi supported Haji Abdullah, who, according to Aliajdar Seizade, adopted him.

Teaching in Tiflis

In the 1830s to the 1840s, Mirza Shafi earned money working as a servant for wealthy people. In Elisabethpol, he also taught oriental languages and calligraphy. Shafi moved to Tiflis in 1840, where he became a teacher. There he established close ties with other prominent figures like Khachatur Abovian, Abbasgulu Bakikhanov and Mirza Fatali Akhundov, who was also his student.

He moved back to Elisabethpol in 1846 and continued to work as a teacher and write poetry until 1850 when he moved back to Tiflis. He began working in the Tiflis Gymnasium and taught the Persian and Azerbaijani languages.

Vazeh and Bodenstedt

In 1844, the German writer and orientalist Friedrich von Bodenstedt, who showed a great interest in the life of the Caucasus and wished to take lessons in oriental languages, came to Tiflis. Soon after his arrival there he met Shafi, who taught him the Azerbaijani and Persian languages.

Bodenstedt left Tiflis in 1848, taking with him a notebook of poems by Mirza Shafi entitled The Key of Wisdom. In 1850, he published a voluminous book called A Thousand and One Days in the East, part of which included works by Shafi. He compiled another book called Songs of Mirza-Shafi which consisted of his translations of Shafi's poems. Twenty years after Shafi's death, Bodenstedt published a book titled From the Heritage of Mirza Shafi, in which he claimed the Shafi's songs were not translations but were his work. Nevertheless, the originals in Persian and Azerbaijani languages have survived to this day, proving the authorship of Mirza Shafi.

Death
According to the historian Mikhail Semevsky, Adolf Berge met "a modest, about 60 year old Tatar" who was a teacher in one of the Muslim schools. It was Mirza Shafi Vazeh. When Berge looked for him the following year in order to get to know him, Shafi had died. Berge wrote in his notes that Shafi had died from gastritis on the night of 16 November 1852.

The day of Vazeh's death was marked by a note in the Acts of the Caucasian Archaeological Commission and the poet was buried in the Muslim cemetery in Tiflis (now known as Pantheon of prominent Azerbaijanis).

Literary activity

The main theme of Shafi's works was the glorification of romantic love and the joy of life, but in some of his poems he denounced the vices of feudal society, opposed slavery and religious fanaticism. He compiled the first anthology of Azerbaijani poetry and a Tatar-Russian dictionary for the Tiflis gymnasium with Russian teacher Ivan Grigoriev.

Until the 1960s, it was believed that the literary legacy of Mirza Shafi Vazeh had been passed on only in the form of translations and that the originals of his poems were lost. In the 31 January 1963 issue of Literaturnaya Gazeta, it was reported that the originals of Mirza Shafi's poems in Azerbaijani and Persian had been found. Only a few of his works have survived, most were translated by Naum Grebnev and Bodenstedt from Azerbaijani and Persian and were included in the book Vazeh. M.-Sh. Lyrica.

Bodenstedt cited one characteristic of Shafi—his dislike of printed books. According to the poet, "real professors do not need printing". Shafi himself was an excellent calligrapher. Bodenstedt writes:

In his memoirs, Mirza Fatali Akhundov wrote that Vazeh "had the art of writing in beautiful handwriting, known by the name Nastaliq". Bodenstedt translated and spread the works of Vazeh. In 1850, he published the book A Thousand and One Days in the East in Stuttgart, where he included some of Vazeh's poems. A year later, they were published separately in Berlin in German under the title Songs of Mirza Shafi. These poems became so popular that they were reissued every year and translated into many languages. The Songs of Mirza Shafi was first translated into Russian by N.I. Eifert. In 1880, he wrote: The Songs of Mirza Shafi,  which have already survived up to 60 editions, is one of the most beloved works of modern poetry in Germany." They have been translated into English, French, Italian, Persian, Hungarian, Czech, Swedish, Dutch, Flemish, Danish, Spanish, Portuguese, most Slavic languages and Hebrew.

The translation into Italian was done by Giacomo Rossi. Russian poet Mikhail Larionovitch Mikhailov translated Shafi's poems into Russian. Shafi's poems also came to the attention of Leo Tolstoy, who told Afanasy Fet in 1880 that they had made a deep impression him.

Research into Shafi's writings is far from complete and continues in Azerbaijan to this day.

Legacy 
Mirza Shafi's works and personality continued to influence Azerbaijani literature after his death. He became the inspiration of the Haji Nuri character in Mirza Fatali Akhundov's play, Hekayat-e Molla Ebrahim Khalil kimiagar.

There are several streets, schools and parks named in his honour, such as the "Mirza Shafi" streets in Tbilisi and Baku, the No.16 middle school and the "Shafi" park in Ganja. In 2010, a memorial plaque was installed for Bodenstedt and Vazeh in Bodenstedt's hometown, Peine, Germany. Similarly, a bust was erected in Ganja in honour of Shafi.

Transfer of the works of Mirza Shafi from Germany to Ganja began in 2014 and a museum dedicated to him was opened in Ganja in November 2017.

Notes

References

External links
 Biography of Mirza-Shafi Vazeh
 Mirza Shafi Vazeh

Persian-language poets
1794 births
1852 deaths
Writers from Ganja, Azerbaijan
19th-century Azerbaijani poets
Burials at Pantheon of prominent Azerbaijanis